KMH: Piano Music in the Continuous Mode is the debut album by the pianist Lubomyr Melnyk. It was originally released in 1978 and then re-released by Unseen Worlds in 2007. It is the first recorded example of continuous music.

Critical reception 

In the late 1980s, The Village Voice named KMH as one of the "10 albums you can't live without".

In his review of the 2007 re-release, Stephen Eddins (Allmusic) praised Melnyk's performance, saying that it "boggles the imagination" and that it would appeal to "fans of minimalism and maverick experimentalism with an immensely attractive sound." Mike Powell (Pitchfork)  described the music as "minimalism at its most lush, ornate, and taxing" and compared it to works by La Monte Young and Erik Satie.

Track listing

References

External links 
 Discogs entry
 Unseen Worlds Records album detail page

Lubomyr Melnyk albums
2007 debut albums